For the Future of Montenegro (Serbian: Za budućnost Crne Gore / За будућност Црне Горе, abbreviated as ZBCG) was a catch-all, mainly cultural conservative and populist pre-election opposition political coalition in Montenegro, formed for the August 2020 parliamentary election. The coalition common list for 2020 election is led by a Montenegrin university professor, Zdravko Krivokapić.

Coalition constituent members for 2020 parliamentary election are; two alliances Democratic Front (New Serb Democracy, Movement for Changes, Democratic People's Party and True Montenegro), Popular Movement (United Montenegro, Workers' Party, independent group in the parliament, also some minor right-wing parties, such as DSJ and DSS), NGO NDCG and Socialist People's Party, which is not part of any of alliances, but maintains close cooperation with the newly-formed Popular Movement. The coalition is also supported by a number of minor non-parliamentary organizations such as far-right Serb Radical Party of Montenegro, as well as far-left Yugoslav Communist Party, also of some Serb national and cultural NGOs in Montenegro, such as Serb National Council of Montenegro.

History

2020 election campaign
The coalition was formed in August 2020, and was initially composed of two alliances Democratic Front, Popular Movement and Socialist People's Party, which is not part of any alliances. The main goal of the coalition is to overthrow the ruling Democratic Party of Socialists (DPS) of President Milo Đukanović, which has been in power since its founding in 1991. All coalition member parties employed a more significant cultural and socially conservative discourse, due to 2020 Montenegrin political crisis and the open conflict between the Serbian Orthodox Church and the DPS-led Montenegrin government, following the adoption of the disputed law on the status of religious communities in Montenegro, supporting 2019-2020 clerical protests in Montenegro and Serbian Orthodox Church rights in Montenegro. Many media, analysts, but also political opponents have labeled the new coalition as the "Vučić's list", because major parties in the new coalition have very close cooperation with the populist SNS-led regime in Serbia, the largest number of constituents of the new coalition were present at several meetings in Belgrade during 2019 and 2020, organized by Serbian President (also the SNS chairman) Aleksandar Vučić, gathering "leaders of Serb communities" in Serbia's neighboring countries.

New parliamentary majority
30 August 2020 election resulted in a victory for the opposition parties and the fall from power of the ruling DPS, which has ruled the country since the introduction of the multi-party system in 1990. Shortly after the polls were closed, before the final results were published, coalition leader Krivokapić announced the coalition's victory stating that "freedom has happened in Montenegro". In his speech he also stated that there won't be revanchism and he also offered ethnic minority parties to enter the new government. The coalition won 32.55 % of the popular vote which equals 27 seats in the parliament. Krivokapić and the leaders of the coalitions Peace is Our Nation and In Black and White, Aleksa Bečić and Dritan Abazović, agreed during meeting on several principles on which the future government will rest, including the formation of an expert government, to continue to work on the European Union accession process, fight against corruption, overcoming society polarization, and to work on changing the disputed Law on Religious Communities. They also welcomed minority parties of Bosniaks and Albanians of Montenegro, and wished to form government with them. The coalition also won additional 13 seats in the municipal elections held in Andrijevica, Budva, Gusinje, Kotor and Tivat.

Dissolution and aftermath
The Coalition eventually dissolved prior to the assembly of the new parliament in October 2020, when all the constituent members formed separate parliamentary groups. Minor United Montenegro and Workers' Party left the Popular Movement of Daka Davidović, joining Democratic Front (DF), while the Movement for Changes (5 MPs) decided to leave DF parliamentary group, returning to its pro-western roots, forming its independent parliamentary group, as earlier did the Socialist People's Party with 5 MPs, leaving the Democratic Front parliamentary group with 17 representatives. 

Since a political split with their candidate for PM, Zdravko Krivokapić, after he questioned their competence to participate in his cabinet, leaders of the Democratic Front, Andrija Mandić, Milan Knežević and Nebojša Medojević started to publicly criticize the alleged influence of the Serbian Orthodox Church, as well of the businessman Daka Davidović on Krivokapić decisions and on composition of his cabinet, which they eventually supported in parliament after all. Mandić claimed that Krivokapić had been appointed head of the "For the Future" list after "pressure and conditioning of electoral support" by "parts of the Serbian Orthodox Church", accusing parts of the church and Krivokapić of "acting on someone's orders from abroad", while Medojević stated that Bishop Joanikije Mićović and priest Gojko Perović set the terms of the church's support and threatened to withdraw Krivokapić from the electoral list, a few days before handing over the electoral lists for 2020 parliamentary election, which Perović categorically denied. During October and November Medojević and Mandić have repeatedly conditioned their parties' support for the Krivokapić Cabinet, if they were not part of it. Mandić explicitly asked Krivokapić to "return the mandate and that they would look for a new PM designate". Unfoundedly accusing and public insults were publicly condemned by the Serbian Church, PM Krivokapić, Davidović, but also by the DF's coalition partner the Socialist People's Party, while the True Montenegro of Marko Milačić decided to left the Democratic Front parliamentary group, out the protest.

Since early 2021, despite the fact he's still an independent politician, many media outlets and opposition subjects, as well some parties in the parliamentary majority accused PM Krivokapić and Ne damo Crnu Goru movement of being affiliated and working in close relations with the centrist Democrats-led Peace is Our Nation alliance, which Krivokapić himself has repeatedly denied. Eventually, the local branches of the organization participated in the 2021 municipal-level elections, in Nikšić and Herceg Novi, as part of the coalition gathered around the Democrats, while, Socialist People's Party decided to rejoin coalition with the Democratic Front in order to participate at the local elections. Ever since the constitution of Krivokapić's cabinet in December 2021, the Democratic Front launched a negative campaign and open public pressure, with frequent demands on PM Krivokapić to choose his cabinet reshuffle with their leaders within, or to resign from the post, supported by populist SNS regime in Serbia, as well SNS-controlled media and affiliated political outlets in Serbia and Montenegro, and besides, DF continued providing its limited parliamentary support to Krivokapić and his cabinet. Prime Minister Zdravko Krivokapic's government was toppled in no-confidence vote after only 14 months in power.

Electoral performance

Parliamentary election

Parliamentary seats (2020)
Elected MPs from the list at the parliamentary elections in August 2020.  List's ballot carrier Krivokapić (NDCG) handed over his parpiamentary seat to a representative of the New Serb Democracy, after his election for Prime Minister in December 2020.

References

Political parties established in 2020
Defunct political party alliances in Montenegro